Jacob Emile Dicko Eng (born 14 September 2004) is a Norwegian football striker who plays for Vålerenga.

Career
Starting his career in Sagene IF, he moved on to play youth football in Lyn. In 2021 he joined Vålerenga where he made his Eliteserien debut in July against Sarpsborg 08. He also played the first round of the 2021 Norwegian Football Cup before playing in the 2021–22 UEFA Conference League qualifying against Gent.

International career
Born in Mali, Eng is of mixed Malian and Norwegian descent and moved to Norway at a young age where he was raised in Oslo. He is a youth international for Norway, having played up to the Norway U19s.

References

External links
Fotbal profile

2004 births
Living people
Footballers from Oslo
Norwegian footballers
Norway youth international footballers
Malian footballers
Norwegian people of Malian descent
Malian people of Norwegian descent
Vålerenga Fotball players
Eliteserien players
Association football forwards